Thomas Radcliffe may refer to:

Thomas Radcliffe (MP died 1403), MP in 1385 and 1395, for Lancashire
Thomas Radcliffe (MP died 1440) MP in May 1421, 1423 and 1433, for Lancashire
Thomas Radclyffe, 3rd Earl of Sussex  (c. 1525 – 1583), MP for Norfolk
Thomas Radcliffe (MP for Portsmouth), in 1586, MP for Portsmouth
Thomas Radcliffe (Irish politician), MP for St Canice
Thomas Walter Radcliffe (b. 1966), actor in The Bill, Inspector Morse, etc.